The Hamilton Urban Area is a New Zealand urban area in the Waikato region. At its centre is Hamilton City, New Zealand's fourth-largest territorial authority. While rural land separates Hamilton from many of the nearby towns, there is significant economic and social integration between the towns and Hamilton.

Like the urban areas of Auckland, Napier-Hastings and Wellington, the Hamilton urban area is subdivided into urban zones. The urban area contains around half the population of the Waikato Region.

Hamilton Urban Zone
While outside the city limits of Hamilton City, there are many lifestyle blocks in the rural land surrounding the city, primarily in Tamahere, Matangi, Horsham Downs and Rototuna.

Cambridge Urban Zone

Te Awamutu Urban Zone

Future
The Statistical Standard of Geographic Areas 2018, developed by Statistics New Zealand, will see Hamilton abolished as a statistical urban area. It will be replaced by five separate urban areas: Hamilton, Cambridge, Te Awamutu, Ngāruawāhia and Kihikihi.

References

Populated places in Waikato
Geography of Hamilton, New Zealand